Hanover County Municipal Airport  is a public airport located 14 miles (22 km) north of the central business district of Richmond, Virginia, and  south of Ashland, Virginia, United States. It is owned by Hanover County in Virginia.

This airport uses the three-letter location identifier code "OFP" which is assigned by the FAA; however, there is no three-letter location identifier code from IATA. The four-letter location identifier code "KOFP" is assigned by ICAO.

The hours of operations are 0700 to 2100 (7am to 9pm) from April to September, and 0700 to 1900 (7am to 7pm) from October to March. All times are for the US Eastern Time Zone.

Facilities and aircraft 

For the 12-month period ending May 31, 2007, the airport had 31,655 aircraft operations, an average of 87 per day. There are 117 aircraft based at this airport, 102 single engine, 13 multi-engine, 1 jet aircraft and 1 helicopter.

There is a full-service fixed-base operator (FBO) called Heart of Virginia Aviation. The county is building a new hangar, renovating the terminal and is updating fencing. There are an industrial park and a commerce center next to the airport.

References

External links 
 Hanover County Municipal Airport at county website

Airports in Virginia
Buildings and structures in Hanover County, Virginia
Transportation in Hanover County, Virginia